Kashiff de Jonge (born 22 March 1985) is a soccer player who plays as a striker for Darby FC. Born in Canada, he was a Guyana international.

College career
He attended Durham College playing for the men's soccer team. In 2013, he scored the winning goal in the shootout to help them win the Campus Cup, earning Athlete of the Week honours. He scored four goals in eight regular season games, to co-lead his team, with the team ultimately losing to Fleming in the playoffs. He was named Durham's MVP for the season.

Club career
In 2009, he joined Guyanese club Alpha United.

In 2015, he began playing for Durham United in League1 Ontario. On June 19, 2016, he scored four goals in a 7-3 victory over Toronto FC III. He finished the 2016 season with nine goals in 20 league matches, being named a league First-Team All-Star at the end of the season. In 2017, he had 3 goals in 15 league matches.

In 2018, he joined Darby FC, finishing the season with 3 goals in 7 league matches. In 2019, he scored 5 goals in 11 league games, including four goals in an 8-0 victory over Toronto Skillz FC on the final matchday of the season on August 18. In 2021, he scored four goals in seven league matches, including a hat trick in a 6-1 victory over 1812 FC Barrie on October 23. In 2022, he scored once in 10 appearances.

International career
In 2012, he was called up to the Guyana national team for the first time.

References

External links
 
 Durham Lords profile

Canadian people of Guyanese descent
Canadian soccer players
Guyanese footballers
Guyana international footballers
Darby FC players
Association football forwards
1985 births
Living people
People from Ajax, Ontario
Alpha United FC players